Ezio Domenico Flagello (January 28, 1931 – March 19, 2009) was born in New York City to Italian Americans.  He sang at the Metropolitan Opera from 1957 to 1984; a bass particularly associated with the Italian repertory.

Career 
Flagello first studied at the Manhattan School of Musicwhere he was a pupil of Friedrich Schorr and John Brownleeand then at the Santa Cecilia Conservatory, Rome, with Luigi Ricci.

Flagello made his professional debut at the Empire State Festival, in Ellenville, New York in 1955, as Dulcamara in L'elisir d'amore. He made his Metropolitan Opera debut on November 9, 1957, as the Jailer in Tosca. Four days later, as a last minute replacement, he sang Leporello in Don Giovanni. He quickly became a favorite with the audience in comic roles, such as Bartolo in The Barber of Seville and Dulcamara in Elisir d'amore, though he also excelled in more lyrical and dramatic repertory. In his 27 seasons with the company, he sang, notably, Rodolfo in La sonnambula, Giorgio in I puritani, Raimondo in Lucia di Lammermoor, Silva in Ernani, Wurm in Luisa Miller, Sparafucile in Rigoletto, Fra Melitone in La forza del destino, Philippe II in Don Carlos, Pogner in Die Meistersinger von Nürnberg, Timur in Turandot, and other roles. He created the role of Enobarbus in Samuel Barber's opera Antony and Cleopatra for the opening of the new Metropolitan Opera at Lincoln Center on September 16, 1966.

Flagello possessed a dark and very rich voice with a remarkable upper register extending to high A. He left an impressive discography which includes Così fan tutte, opposite Leontyne Price, Tatiana Troyanos, George Shirley, Sherrill Milnes, under Erich Leinsdorf, Lucrezia Borgia, opposite Montserrat Caballé, Alfredo Kraus, Shirley Verrett, Lucia di Lammermoor and Luisa Miller, both opposite Anna Moffo and Carlo Bergonzi, Rigoletto, opposite Robert Merrill and under  Georg Solti, Ernani, Ballo in maschera, Forza del destino, all opposite Leontyne Price. He also recorded Handel's Alcina and Bellini's I Puritani, both opposite Joan Sutherland. He also interpreted the role of Harapha in the famous Archiv recording of Handel's oratorio Samson (1968).

Flagello also enjoyed a successful international career, appearing frequently in Vienna, Milan, Berlin, London, and other places. In addition to his operatic career, he had a small role in the flashback sequences in The Godfather Part II (1974) as an impresario threatened by Don Fanucci. Ezio Flagello retired from the stage in 1987. He was the brother of the composer Nicolas Flagello. He was married to Italian-American writer Anna Mione, with whom he had four children. He died at his Palm Bay, Florida home on March 19, 2009.

Filmography

References 
 The Metropolitan Opera Encyclopedia, edited by David Hamilton, (Simon & Schuster, New York 1987). 
 The Complete Dictionary of Opera & Operetta, James Anderson, (Wings Books, 1993) 

1931 births
2009 deaths
American operatic basses
Accademia Nazionale di Santa Cecilia alumni
People from Palm Bay, Florida
Burials at Kensico Cemetery
20th-century American male opera singers
Singers from New York City
Classical musicians from New York (state)
Singers from Florida
Classical musicians from Florida